Muhammad Zaki Abd al-Qadir  (1 January 1906 - 7 March 1981) was an Egyptian journalist and multi-topic writer. Although he graduated from Cairo University in law in  1928, he turned to journalism. One of the 100 founding members of the Syndicate of Journalists in 1941, collaborated with various Egyptian notable newspapers, such as Akhbār al-Yawm and Al-Ahram. Publicly known by "Nahw Al-Noor" (Towards the Light), a column he wrote in 1950s, which formed the core of his new-style journalism. He also wrote many books in literary and non-literary, fiction and non-fiction subjects and was elected a member of the Academy of the Arabic Language in Cairo.

Biography 
Muhammad Zaki Abd al-Qadir was born on 1 January 1906 in the town of Farsis, Zagazig, in the Sharqia Governorate under Khedivate of Egypt. A grandson of the village mayor, He grew up in a large house inhabited by the mayor's family - his paternal grandfather - which made up of several small families, and everyone lives together in one household supported by the elder father, He who earns the family budget from the income of his agricultural property and dividing it among the members. Muhammad Zaki's father was engaged in trade independently although he was integrated into his small family in the large family but using his own funds. 
He completed his primary education in the American School in city of Zagazig, then joined the El-Elhamiya Secondary School in Cairo. Continued his higher education in the Faculty of Law, and obtained a Bachelor of Laws from Cairo University in 1928. After graduating, he worked as a lawyer for a while, then left it and entered the journalism. He had to spend some years until he reaches the age eligible to be accepted as a member of the Egyptian Lawyers Syndicate, so he turned to writing and journalism.

Journalism career  
He worked as an editor for “Daily Al-Siyassiyah” of Liberal Constitutional Party, then the editor-in-chief of the “Weekly Al-Siyassiyah”, A newspaper that gave him the opportunity to get close to a large number of Egyptian thinkers at the time. He focused on the two topics of fiction and politics in "Al-Siyassiyah" until it was closed in 1931. He established the "Al-Fosoul" in 1944, a popular monthly cultural magazine, then worked with the "Al Sha'b" newspaper in 1936, where he took the foregin department. He also worked as an editor in "Al-Ahram" newspaper from 1937, then he moved to "Akhbār al-Yawm" in 1950, and became famous for the his column "Nahw Al-Noor" (Towards the Light), And headed the editor-in-chief of Al-Mukhtar magazine. Nahw Al-Nur made his reputation as a journalist of ethics who reflecting "people's feelings and expressing their conscience", especially for farmers, workers and government employees before the July 23 revolution. 

He continued his journalism work without retirement until his death. During his journalistic career, he had a weekly literary-cultural salon which he held in his office on Sharif Street. He is one of the 100 founding members of the Egyptian Journalists Syndicate in 1941. He was elected a member of the Academy of the Arabic Language in Cairo, And he was awarded an honorary fellowship in Eid el-Fan (Arts Holiday).

Death 
He died on 7 March 1982 in Cairo at the age of 75.

Works 
 
 
 
 , 1949
 , 1955
 , 1959
 , 1960
 , 1960
 , 1961  
 , 1962
 , 1963
 , 1963
 , 1963
 , 1964
 , 1965
 , 1966
 , 1965
 , 1966
 , 1967
 , 1968
 , 1968
 , 1968
 , 1970
 , 1971
 , 1972
 , 1973
 , 1976
 , 1977
 , 1978
 , 1978
 , 1980
 , 1980
 , 1982

References

External links 
 at archive.alsharekh.org (Arabic)

1906 births
1982 deaths
Egyptian columnists
Egyptian newspaper editors
Egyptian male writers
Egyptian non-fiction writers
20th-century Egyptian writers
Cairo University alumni
People from Zagazig
Egyptian memoirists
Salon-holders